Erzurum BB GSK, short for Erzurum Büyükşehir Belediyesi Gençlik Spor Kulübü, is the ice hockey team of the same named multi-sport club in Erzurum, Turkey founded by the metropolitan municipality. Currently, the team compete in the Turkish Ice Hockey Super League (TBHSL).

Achievements
The team finished the 2015–16 season third placed after playoffs.

Current roster
.

References

Ice hockey teams in Turkey
Turkish Ice Hockey Super League teams
Sport in Erzurum